Don't Waste Your Wishes is a Christmas compilation album by American rock band The Killers, featuring their yearly Christmas singles released from 2006 to 2016. One hundred percent of proceeds from sales of the album were donated to the Product Red campaign, headed by Bobby Shriver and U2 lead singer Bono. The album was released exclusively on the iTunes Store on November 18, 2016, and a limited-edition CD was released on December 9, 2016.

Background
The Killers have become recognized for their work with the Product Red campaign, headed by Bono and Bobby Shriver. Every year since 2006, the band has released a Christmas song in support of the campaign. Every single is released around December 1, coinciding with World AIDS Day. By the time of the album's release, the band had released eleven Christmas-themed songs and music videos.

Music videos have been released for each of the first ten tracks and a website has been set up specifically for the project.

The album debuted at number 41 on Billboards Top Rock Albums chart on December 10, 2016.

Track listing

Charts

References

2016 Christmas albums
2016 compilation albums
Charity albums
Christmas albums by American artists
Christmas compilation albums
Island Records compilation albums
The Killers compilation albums
Rock Christmas albums